Nuclear factor NF-kappa-B p100 subunit is a protein that in humans is encoded by the NFKB2 gene.

Function 

NF-κB has been detected in numerous cell types that express cytokines, chemokines, growth factors, cell adhesion molecules, and some acute phase proteins in health and in various disease states. NF-κB is activated by a wide variety of stimuli such as cytokines, oxidant-free radicals, inhaled particles, ultraviolet irradiation, and bacterial or viral products. Inappropriate activation of NF-kappa-B has been linked to inflammatory events associated with autoimmune arthritis, asthma, septic shock, lung fibrosis, glomerulonephritis, atherosclerosis, and AIDS. In contrast, complete and persistent inhibition of NF-kappa-B has been linked directly to apoptosis, inappropriate immune cell development, and delayed cell growth. For reviews, see Chen et al. (1999) and Baldwin (1996).[supplied by OMIM]

Clinical significance 

Mutation of the NFKB2 gene has been linked to Common variable immunodeficiency (CVID) as the cause of the disease. Other genes might also be responsible. The frequency of NFKB2 mutation in CVID population is yet to be established.

The protein NFKB2 can become mutated and lead to hereditary endocrine and immuneodeficiences. The mutation occurs at the C-terminus of NFKB2 and it causes common variable immunodeficienciency which in turn causes endocrine deficiency and immunodeficiencies. A NFKB2 mutation can cause things like adrenocorticotropic hormone deficiency and DAVID syndrome which is a pituitary hormone deficiency and CVID.

The mutations that occur within the C-terminus affect the serine 866 and 870. These serines are considered phosphorylation sites for NFKB2.  These mutations at the serine's in the C-terminus lead to CVID in combination with other endocrine deficiencies. These endocrine deficiencies along with the mutation of NFKB2, lead scientists to believe that mutation of NFKB2 is a rare hereditary disease called DAVID's disease.

Interactions 

NFKB2 has been shown to interact with:

 BCL3, 
 BTRC, 
 MAP3K8, 
 NFKB1, 
 NFKBIE, 
 RELA, 
 RELB, 
 REL, and
 TSC22D3.

See also 
 NF-κB
 DAVID syndrome

References

Further reading

External links 
 
 
 

Transcription factors